The Diocese of Tanga is a north-eastern diocese in the Anglican Church of Tanzania: its current bishop is the Rt Revd Dr Maimbo Mndolwa.

Notes

Anglican Church of Tanzania dioceses
 
Tanga, Tanzania